Cardtronics is a global financial services technology company that provides automated teller machines to retailers, and operates the Allpoint interbank network. Since 2017, Cardtronics’ network counted over 200,000 affiliated ATMs and is the largest ATM owner/operator in the world. In addition to the Allpoint network, Cardtronics provides and operates ATMs for large retailers such as Kroger and Circle K.

In January 2021, Cardtronics accepted an offer from NCR Corporation to acquire the company in a deal valued at $2.5 billion. On June 21, 2021 Cardtronics became the wholly owned subsidiary of NCR Corporation.

References

External links 
 

Financial technology companies
Financial services companies of the United States
Information technology consulting firms of the United States
Companies based in Houston
Companies established in 1989
2021 mergers and acquisitions